Mankachar Assembly constituency is one of the 126 assembly constituencies of  Assam a north east state of India. Mankachar is also part of Dhubri Lok Sabha constituency.

Members of Legislative Assembly

Old Constituency Name: Dhubri (South)

Present Constituency Name: Mankachar

Election results

2021 results

2016 results

2011 results

2006 results

2001 results

1996 results

1991 results

1985 results

1983 results

1978 results

See also
 Mankachar
 Hatsingimari
 South Salmara-Mankachar District
 Dhubri district
 List of constituencies of Assam Legislative Assembly
 Government of Assam
 Government of India

References

External links 
 

Assembly constituencies of Assam
South Salmara-Mankachar district